Combined Air Operations Centres (CAOCs) are multinational headquarters for tactical and operational control of NATO Air Forces below the Joint Force Command level. They operate within the NATO Integrated Air Defense System (NATINADS) framework.

Within the European NATO command structure they are subordinated to NATO's Allied Air Command (AIRCOM), and is superior to Control and Reporting Centres, national airspace control centers and Regional Airspace Surveillance Coordination Centres (RASCC) such as BALTNET. NATO may also operate in Europe static and deploy-able CAOCs.

Predecessor organizations of the CAOC were Air Tactical Operations Centre (ATOC) and Air Defence Operations Centre'' (ADOC). Until 1980 the two HQs for air attack and air defence operated autonomously.

Active locations

Former locations

References

Further reading
MILITÄRISCHES STUDIENGLOSAR ENGLISCH Teil I, A – K, Bundessprachenamt (Stand Januar 2001), page 309, definition: Combined Air Operations Centre [CAOC].

 
Command and control